Rosario García Ortega (1911–1994) was an Argentine film and television actress.

Selected filmography
 Agustina of Aragon (1950)
 The Song of Sister Maria (1952)
 From Madrid to Heaven (1952)
 Comedians (1954)
 High Fashion (1954)
 For Men Only (1960)
 Goya, a Story of Solitude (1971)
 The Regent's Wife (1975)
 The House of Bernarda Alba (1987)

References

Bibliography 
 Ronald Schwartz. Great Spanish Films Since 1950. Scarecrow Press, 2008.

External links 
 

1911 births
1994 deaths
Argentine film actresses
Spanish film actresses
Argentine television actresses
Spanish television actresses
People from Buenos Aires
Argentine emigrants to Spain